WEST (1400 kHz) is a commercial AM radio station licensed to Easton, Pennsylvania, and serving the Lehigh Valley.  It airs a rhythmic contemporary radio format simulcast with AM 1600 WHOL.  Both stations are owned by Major Keystone LLC.  The studios and offices are on Colorado Street in Allentown.

WEST broadcasts at 1,000 watts.  Its transmitter is on St. John Street in Easton, near Interstate 78.  Programming is also heard on 90 watt FM translator W258DV at 99.5 MHz in Bethlehem.

History
WEST began operations in 1936. The station was locally owned and employed a general entertainment format evolving into a popular music format by the late 1940s. At that point WEST-FM signed on at 96.1. For decades, the stations simulcast WEST's Middle Of The Road Popular Music format. In 1973, though, 96.1 became WLEV (now WCTO) and began offering a automated Soft Adult Contemporary format. They played the softer rock hits of the 1960s and 1970s, along with a lot of current music. They were known as "Hit Parade Music" at one point. WEST continued with its MOR format blending artists like Frank Sinatra, Nat King Cole, Peggy Lee, and others with some big bands and softer baby boomer pop sounds from the likes of Elvis Presley, The Beatles, Connie Francis, Neil Diamond, Tom Jones, The Carpenters, and others. Both WEST and WLEV were owned by Sound Media and then by Telemedia Group.

In the late 1970s, WEST would switch to strictly a Big Band and Standards format and dropped the adult contemporary and baby boomer pop songs, but in 1981 switched back to more of a Middle Of The Road format like they had in the mid 1970s. It used a syndicated format called "Hitparade" and played half adult standards and half soft adult contemporary songs. In the late 1980s the station switched to a similarly formatted satellite delivered service called "Stardust", with which they remained until 2001.

Stardust leaned big bands and standards initially but in the 1990s the format focused more on the soft AC and soft oldies artists mixed into the format. WEST had a live morning and afternoon local show as well as hours of specialty programs during the weekends, but the rest of the time used the syndicated "Stardust" format.

In 1995, the station was sold, along with WLEV, to Citadel Broadcasting. Still, the format remained Adult Standards. In 1997, Citadel acquired WFMZ FM, which by then had a format that was evolving to be musically closer to WLEV. In 1997, it was decided that there was no need for two AC stations in the Lehigh Valley, so they combined aspects of the AC formats from both stations and moved the WLEV call letters and format and some of the air staff to 100.7 that July.

WEST, though, would be sold to Maranatha Broadcasting, which previously owned 100.7 FM, in 1997. Maranatha Broadcasting also owned and still owns Channel 69 WFMZ-TV. It was thought that WEST might switch to a religious format but that did not happen. WEST did however simulcast the 5 p.m. newscast that aired on Channel 69. WEST did continue with its MOR format as well as many specialty programs.

In 2001, when WKAP (now WSAN) dropped Westwood One's Standards format for Oldies, WEST switched to Westwood One's similarly format Standards format which evolved to a slightly more soft AC sound in 2002. The specialty shows and the Channel 69 newscasts remained. WEST was rumored to be switching to Oldies in 2006 when WKAP would drop oldies for religious programming. But that also never happened.

In 2007, Maranatha sold WEST to Matthew J. Braccili, who also owns WHOL. That April, WEST's intellectual unit was shut down totally including the satellite standards format and the specialty shows. 1400 WEST then began to simulcast the Spanish language format airing over WHOL. In December, 2010, Matthew J. Braccili purchased FM translator W258BM in Easton and transmits WEST AM on FM frequency 99.5.

Effective October 11, 2019, Braccili sold WEST, WHOL, and three translators to Victor Martinez's Hispanic Broadcasting Radio for $1.35 million.

On December 21, 2020 at 12 p.m, WEST switched to a rhythmic contemporary format branding as "Loud 99.5". The station ran commercial-free until after New Years. 16 days later, WHOL dropped its conservative talk format to a simulcast on WEST once again; branding as "Loud 106.9/99.5".

The station was sold to Major Keystone LLC on January 17, 2022.

See also
Media in the Lehigh Valley

References

External links

EST
Easton, Pennsylvania
Radio stations established in 1936
1936 establishments in Pennsylvania
Rhythmic contemporary radio stations in the United States